The Barbados bullfinch (Loxigilla barbadensis) is a seedeater bird that is found only on the Caribbean island-nation of Barbados, where it is the only endemic bird species.

Taxonomy 
The Barbados bullfinch was previously considered a subspecies of the Lesser Antillean bullfinch (Loxigilla noctis), which is found on neighboring islands.  Despite the misleading nature of its name, the Barbados bullfinch is not a bullfinch at all but a seedeater.  The bird is known locally as a Sparrow or Sparky.

Description 
The Barbados bullfinch is a small bird, 14–15 cm (5.5–6 in). The upperparts are a dark olive-grey, the wings are mostly brown, underparts are greyish, while the under tail-coverts are tawny. The species is not sexually dimorphic, with females and males having similar plumage. 
The birds' calls include simple twittering, an occasional harsh petulant note, and a sharp trill .

Distribution and habitat 
The Barbados bullfinch is found only on the island of Barbados. The birds' habitat includes shrubbery and forest undergrowth; the species has adapted well to humans, often being found in close proximity to areas of human habitation, such as gardens.

Reproduction 

Barbados bullfinches construct a globular nest, with a side entrance, in a tree or shrub. The species lays two to three spotted eggs.

Behavior 
Barbados bullfinches are extremely innovative and tame birds. Barbados bullfinches living in urban environments were found to have better problem-solving skills and a better immunocompetence than the ones living in rural areas of Barbados. As for their temperament, urban Barbados bullfinches were found to be bolder but more neophobic than their rural counterparts.

Gallery

References

External links

Barbados bullfinch
Birds of Barbados
Endemic fauna of Barbados
Barbados bullfinch
Barbados bullfinch